Stephen John Officer (born 18 August 1949) is a former Australian rules footballer who played with South Melbourne in the Victorian Football League (VFL).

Notes

External links 

Stephen Officer's playing statistics from The VFA Project

Living people
1949 births
Australian rules footballers from South Australia
Sydney Swans players
Brunswick Football Club players